Imre Bánrévi (born 14 November 1954) is a Hungarian gymnast. He competed in eight events at the 1976 Summer Olympics.

References

1954 births
Living people
Hungarian male artistic gymnasts
Olympic gymnasts of Hungary
Gymnasts at the 1976 Summer Olympics
Gymnasts from Budapest